Sausal Creek,  long, is one of the principal creeks in Oakland, California.

The creek derives its name from the Spanish word for willow grove (sausal).  Native arroyo willows were once common along its banks.  Efforts are underway to restore the willows and the creek itself. A volunteer group, Friends of Sausal Creek, helps remove invasive species and plant native species. Some of the invasive species in the Sausal Creek watershed include Monterey pine trees, ivy, French broom, and wild mustard. The friends run workdays at the Scout Hut in Dimond Park on Saturdays throughout the year.

Course
The North fork of the creek, also known as Shepherd Creek, begins in the hills above Oakland, flowing down Shepherd Canyon, named for an early landowner at the top of the canyon, William J. Shepherd.  The South fork, also known as Palo Seco Creek, also begins in the hills, and flows down Palo Seco Canyon to a confluence with the north fork in the linear valley where the Montclair district is situated.  The creek then cuts through the shutter ridge which defines the linear valley (formed by the Hayward Fault), and runs down to the flatlands through Dimond Canyon, where it passes under historic Leimert Bridge.  It then runs southwest through the San Antonio district to empty into the Oakland Estuary.  The creek is mostly open in the hills section, and runs in culverts as it approaches the bay.

History
The first inhabitants of the Sausal Creek watershed were the Huchiun or Yrgin tribelets of the Ohlone people. They harvested acorns, buckeyes and other foodstuffs at a time when enormous live oaks, alders, willows, and big-leaf maples grew on the creek's banks in what is now downtown Oakland, California. Also, large Coast redwoods (Sequoia sempervirens) grew on the ridge where Skyline Boulevard now runs.

Sausal Creek was named Arroyo del Bosque by Father Juan Crespí during the Pedro Fages Expedition in 1772.  Later the Sausal watershed became part of the Rancho San Antonio land grant to Sergeant Luis Maria Peralta in 1820. By 1841 Peralta's descendants were selling the giant redwoods and by 1850 there were at least ten sawmills operating in the watershed. One casualty of the lumber business, the Blossom Rock Tree, had a trunk diameter of 33.5 feet and was over 300 feet tall. It was so named because sailors used it as a navigational aid to avoid an underwater hazardous rock, Blossom Rock, in San Francisco Bay.

The creek was also known as Fruitvale Creek, when the settlement of Fruitvale was established in 1856 when Quaker nurseryman Henderson Luelling, planted hundreds of cherry trees along Sausal Creek, and named the area "Fruit Vale".

As Oakland grew larger, the Sausal Creek watershed was significantly altered. When people built their houses next to Sausal Creek, they often planted gardens, which brought in plants from around the globe. Over time, since many of these plants were foreign, they were not adapted to the environment, and they could not be controlled.

In 1935, the Works Progress Administration began work deep in the canyon. Initially they were funded to clear landslides and build fire trails. In 1937, the WPA constructed a sanitary sewer that runs adjacent to Sausal Creek under the creek-side trail that runs from Dimond Park to slightly beyond the Leimert Bridge. In 1939 and 1940, further work was done to channelize the creek in concrete and stabilize its banks. The creek still ran, but at a quickening pace. What had once been a slow, babbling brook was now a torrential storm. Culverts soon covered the creek, but not without a fight. In the 1980s, behind the Cohen-Bray House, on 29th avenue, near International Boulevard, preservationists fought over a culvert project that preservationists thought would deal a blow to a neighborhood now rife with drugs and crime.

Creek restoration projects
Since then, attitudes about Sausal Creek have changed. A dangerous creek that people once thought needed to be filled with concrete now benefits from citizen and government support. In 1996, the Friends of Sausal Creek was formed with support from the City of Oakland, the Aquatic Outreach Institute (now called The Watershed Project), and the Alameda County Flood Control and Water Conservation District. The group is interested in the entire Sausal Creek Watershed, and has organized clean-up hikes within the canyon, water quality monitoring of the creek, and has planted a native plant garden and a riparian restoration site at the lower end of the hiking trail in Dimond Park.

Currently, the City of Oakland wants to remove culverts along parts of Sausal Creek in Dimond Park. The Sausal Creek restoration project is a collaborative effort by the City of Oakland, the Alameda County Flood Control & Water Conservation District and the Friends of Sausal Creek. The restoration focuses on the creek that runs through Diamond Park below Wellington Street. The project will remove the culvert below Wellington to open up a long-buried stretch of creek, and widen the existing creek to create a more stable, natural and diverse riparian corridor. This plan has been met with some opposition, as it would remove some redwood trees and remove parts of a field in Dimond Park. However, the project is intended to control erosion that threatens houses that are located dangerously close to the creek. In addition the creek will return to its natural state in this section with native plants and trees and the removal of concrete. The concrete in this section of Sausal Creek is not suitable to the rainbow trout that need to move through the creek and this section of the creek has significant amounts of plastic bottles, and other forms of trash. 250 feet of Sausal Creek will be opened up if the project is approved.

The project will cost $4 million if completed, with funding coming from the State of California River Parkways Grant (Proposition 50), the Alameda County Flood Control & Water Conservation District and Measure DD: Oakland Trust for Clean Water & Safe Parks.

See also
 List of watercourses in the San Francisco Bay Area
 San Leandro Creek
 Temescal Creek

References

External links
 Friends of Sausal Creek

Rivers of Alameda County, California
Berkeley Hills
Geography of Oakland, California
Tributaries of San Francisco Bay
Works Progress Administration in California
Rivers of Northern California